Slatnik is a  mountain in northwestern Slovenia. It stands southwest of the Sorica Plateau.

Name
The name Slatnik appears in Slovenia as both an oronym and a settlement name (e.g., Slatnik, Veliki Slatnik, etc.). Like related names (e.g., Slatenik), it is derived from the common noun slatina 'spring with salty or acidic water', referring to a local geographical feature.

References

External links
 Mount Slatnik at Geopedia

Mountains of Upper Carniola
Municipality of Škofja Loka
One-thousanders of Slovenia